Mallet-Guy's sign is a medical sign to detect signs of pancreatitis. It is pain elicited with deep palpation of the left subcostal and epigastric region, suggesting pancreatic inflammation. It is named after Pierre Mallet-Guy.

References

Medical signs